An appendage (or outgrowth) is an external body part, or natural prolongation, that protrudes from an organism's body.

In arthropods, an appendage refers to any of the homologous body parts that may extend from a body segment, including antennae, mouthparts (including mandibles, maxillae and maxillipeds), gills, locomotor legs (pereiopods for walking, and pleopods for swimming), sexual organs (gonopods), and parts of the tail (uropods).  Typically, each body segment carries one pair of appendages.  An appendage which is modified to assist in feeding is known as a maxilliped or gnathopod.

In vertebrates, an appendage can refer to a locomotor part such as a tail, fins on a fish, limbs (legs, flippers or wings) on a tetrapod; exposed sex organ; defensive parts such as horns and antlers; or sensory organs such as auricles, proboscis (trunk and snout) and barbels.

Appendages may become uniramous, as in insects and centipedes, where each appendage comprises a single series of segments, or it may be biramous, as in many crustaceans, where each appendage branches into two sections. Triramous (branching into three) appendages are also possible.

All arthropod appendages are variations of the same basic structure (homologous), and which structure is produced is controlled by "homeobox" genes. Changes to these genes have allowed scientists to produce animals (chiefly Drosophila melanogaster) with modified appendages, such as legs instead of antennae.

References

See also
 Appendicular skeleton

Animal anatomy